Eddy Téllez (born 3 November 1943) is a Cuban sprinter. He competed in the men's 400 metres at the 1968 Summer Olympics.

References

1943 births
Living people
Athletes (track and field) at the 1968 Summer Olympics
Cuban male sprinters
Olympic athletes of Cuba
Place of birth missing (living people)